Wolfram Paulus (12 August 1957 – 28 May 2020) was an Austrian film director and screenwriter. His 1986 film Heidenlöcher was entered into the 36th Berlin International Film Festival.

Selected filmography
 Heidenlöcher (1986)

References

External links

1957 births
2020 deaths
Austrian film directors
Austrian screenwriters
Austrian male screenwriters
German-language film directors
Austrian television directors